The black scrub robin (Cercotrichas podobe) is a species of bird in the family Muscicapidae.
It is found in Bahrain, Burkina Faso, Cameroon, Chad, Djibouti, Egypt, Eritrea, Ethiopia, Guinea-Bissau, Israel, Jordan, Mali, Mauritania, Niger, Nigeria, Oman, Saudi Arabia, Senegal, Somalia, Sudan, United Arab Emirates, and Yemen.
Its natural habitat is dry savanna.

Gallery

References

black scrub robin
Birds of the Sahel
Birds of the Middle East
black scrub robin
Articles containing video clips
Taxonomy articles created by Polbot